The Bulle–Romont railway line is a standard gauge railway line in the canton of Fribourg, Switzerland. The line is owned and operated by Transports publics Fribourgeois (TPF).

History 
The Chemin de fer Bulle–Romont (BR) opened the line between Bulle and Romont on 1 July 1868. The line was electrified on 8 May 1946.

In 1942, the BR merged with two other companies to form the Chemins de fer fribourgeois Gruyère–Fribourg–Morat (GFM). The GFM, in turn, became the Transports publics Fribourgeois (TPF) in 2000.

Notes

References 
 

Railway lines in Switzerland
Transport in the canton of Fribourg
Railway lines opened in 1868
15 kV AC railway electrification